The Australian Fencing Federation (AFF) is the national governing body for the sport of fencing within Australia. It was founded in 1949.

Member States
The AFF comprises six member states:
 ACT Fencing Association
 NSW Fencing Association
 Queensland Fencing Association
 Fencing South Australia
 Fencing Victoria
 Western Australia Fencing Association

Life Members
The AFF currently has 23 life members.
 Eddis Linton
 Robyn Chaplin
 Professor Joan Beck
 David McKenzie AM
 Max England
 Julius Pollack
 Andy V Szakall
 Ivan Lund
 Laurie Smith
 Patrick Morley
 Beverley Chan
 Harry Sommerville
 John Fethers
 Professor Micheal O'Brien
 William (Bill) Ronald OAM
 Janet Haswell
 Denise Dapre OAM
 Peter Anderson
 Vivienne Watts (Tucker)
 Helen Smith AM
 Alex Donaldson
 Jeff Gray
 Peter Osvath

References

External links
 
 

National members of the Oceania Fencing Confederation
Sports governing bodies in Australia
Fencing organizations
Fencing in Australia
1949 establishments in Australia
Sports organizations established in 1949